The AAI Award is an annual award in the United States, given to the most outstanding senior collegiate female gymnast in the country. The award is voted on by NCAA women's gymnastics head coaches and sponsored by American Athletic, Inc.

Winners

See also
 Nissen-Emery Award

References 

Awards established in 1982
Sports awards honoring women